Larry Eaglin (born August 27, 1948) is a former American football defensive back. He played for the Houston Oilers in 1973.

References

1948 births
Living people
American football defensive backs
Stephen F. Austin Lumberjacks football players
Houston Oilers players